The Tyneside Passenger Transport Executive was the operations arm of the Tyneside Passenger Transport Authority, created by the Transport Act 1968. and came into operation on 1 January 1970.

Area covered

The initial operating area of the PTE covered a number of local authority areas in south east Northumberland and north east County Durham.

From Northumberland:
 County Borough of Newcastle upon Tyne
 County Borough of Tynemouth
 Municipal Borough of Wallsend
 Municipal Borough of Whitley Bay
 Lonbenton Urban District
 Newburn Urban District
 Seaton Valley Urban District
 from Castle Ward Rural District, the civil parishes of
 Brunswick
 Dinnington 
 Hazlerigg 
 Heddon-on-the-Wall 
 North Gosforth 
 Ponteland
 Woolsington
 from Hexham Rural District
 Wylam civil parish

From County Durham:
 County Borough of Gateshead
 County Borough of South Shields
 Municipal Borough of Jarrow
 Blaydon Urban District
 Felling Urban District
 Hebburn Urban District
 Ryton Urban District
 Whickham Urban District

Later expansion

On 1 March 1973, the PTE area expanded to include two new local authority areas.

From County Durham:
 County Borough of Sunderland
 Boldon Urban District

Operations
Tyneside PTE took over the municipal bus operations of Newcastle Corporation and South Shields Corporation from 1 January 1970 and added those of Sunderland Corporation from 1 March 1973. It adopted a livery very similar to that used by Newcastle Transport.

In 1972, it took control of Market Place Ferry (now known as the Shields Ferry) crossing the River Tyne between North Shields and South Shields.

Replacement
The Local Government Act 1972 created the metropolitan county of Tyne and Wear on 1 April 1974. As a result, the Tyneside Passenger Transport Authority was abolished, with the new Tyne and Wear County Council taking over responsibility for that role. The PTE's operating area was altered to coincide with that of the new county, changing to become the Tyne and Wear PTE.

Areas removed
Some places in the Tyneside PTE area were not included in the new county and thus were no longer part of a PTE area:

 from Castle Ward Rural District, the civil parishes of
 Heddon-on-the-Wall
 Ponteland
(which became part of Castle Morpeth district)

 from Hexham Rural District
 Wylam civil parish
(which became part of Tynedale district)

 Seaton Valley Urban District was split, with three wards remaining in the new Tyne and Wear PTE area (as part of North Tyneside district). The remaining wards were not included in Tyne and Wear and became part of Blyth Valley district.

 the Municipal Borough of Whitley Bay was also split. Most of the borough formed part of North Tyneside district in Tyne and Wear. The northern section of the borough, the area around Seaton Sluice, was not included in Tyne and Wear and became part of Blyth Valley district.

Areas added
New areas were incorporated into Tyne and Wear and thus became part of the new Tyne and Wear PTE from 1 April 1974:

From County Durham:
 Hetton Urban District
 Houghton-le-Spring Urban District
 Washington Urban District
 from Chester-le-Street Rural District, the civil parishes of
 Birtley
 Harraton
 Lamesley
 South Biddick

References

Public transport executives in the United Kingdom